Fabian Lamotte (born 25 February 1983) is a German former professional footballer who played as a right-back.

Career
After being released by Sturm Graz upon the expiration of his contract in 2010, Lamotte trained with Hertha BSC II to keep fit while searching for a club.

He tore his achilles tendon before signing with Viktoria Berlin in February 2012, making two appearances in the NOFV-Oberliga until the summer.

On 11 June 2012, it was announced he would join Regionalliga Südwest side KSV Hessen Kassel on a two-year contract. Four days later, however, the move was called off.

Honours
Schalke 04
 DFB-Pokal runner-up: 2004–05
 UEFA Intertoto Cup: 2004

Sturm Graz
Austrian Cup: 2009–10

References

External links
 
 

1983 births
Living people
People from Marsberg
Sportspeople from Arnsberg (region)
German footballers
Footballers from North Rhine-Westphalia
Association football fullbacks
Bundesliga players
2. Bundesliga players
Austrian Football Bundesliga players
FC Schalke 04 players
TSV 1860 Munich players
SK Sturm Graz players
FC Viktoria 1889 Berlin players